Gee Street Records was a British hip hop record label started by Jon Baker in 1985. The label's name came from its original location, a converted warehouse on Gee Street (off Old Street) in London, EC1.
 
Between 1980 and 1984, label head Baker lived in New York City.  After returning to London in 1984, he became a hip-hop promoter, and in 1985 opened Gee Street Records and began releasing white-label dance and hip-hop records. Many of these broke new ground. The label developed a roster of prominent domestic UK acts, including DJ Richie Rich, Outlaw Posse, and Stereo MC's, and US acts, including P.M. Dawn, Doug E. Fresh, Gravediggaz, and New Kingdom.

In 1990, Gee Street was acquired by Chris Blackwell's Island Records. After Blackwell left Island and the PolyGram group in 1998, Baker bought back Gee Street and sold it to Richard Branson's fledgling V2 Records. The label was shuttered in 2001.

In 2006, V2 sold its American catalogue, including Gee Street, to Sheridan Square Entertainment, home of Artemis Records. In 2010, Artemis was sold to Entertainment One Music.

Selected discography
 Jungle Brothers, Straight out of the Jungle (1988, licensed from Warlock Records)
 Stereo MCs 33-45-78 (1989)
 Eternity, Project One (1989)
 Richie Rich, I Can Make You Dance (1988)
 Outlaw Posse, My Afro's on Fire (1989)
 Stereo MCs, Supernatural (1990)
 PM Dawn, Of the Heart, of the Soul and of the Cross: The Utopian Experience (1991)
 Carlene Davis, Carlene Davis (1992)
 Stereo MCs, Connected (1992)
 New Kingdom, Heavy Load (1993)
 PM Dawn, The Bliss Album…? (Vibrations of Love and Anger and the Ponderance of Life and Existence) (1993)
 Gravediggaz, 6 Feet Deep (1994)
 Doug E. Fresh, Play (1994)
 PM Dawn, Jesus Wept (1995)
 Malcolm McLaren, Paris (1995)
 Ambersunshower, Walter T. Smith (1996)
 New Kingdom, Paradise Don't Come Cheap (1996)
 Jungle Brothers, Raw Deluxe (1997)
 Gravediggaz, The Pick, the Sickle and the Shovel (1998)
 Various Artists, soundtrack to the motion picture Senseless (1998)
 RZA, Bobby Digital in Stereo (1998)
 PM Dawn, Dearest Christian, I'm So Very Sorry for Bringing You Here. Love, Dad (1998)
 Ky-Mani Marley, The Journey (2000)
 Tragedy Khadafi, Against All Odds (2001)

See also
 Jon Baker
 List of record labels

References

External links
 Clunis, A.Gee Jam puts down roots in Portland 22 Dec 2000 The Jamaica Gleaner retrieved 26 July 2010

British record labels
Record labels established in 1985
Record labels disestablished in 1996
Hip hop record labels
Island Records
British companies established in 1985